Line 12 is an east–west line of the Shanghai Metro network. The remaining stations opened on 19 December 2015. Since the opening of the extension in December 2015, Line 12 has the most interchanges with other metro lines in the Shanghai Metro. The line is colored forest green on system maps.

History

Construction accident
On December 31, 2012, the ground maintenance warehouse of Jinqiao Parking Lot collapsed during the construction process, resulting in 5 deaths and 18 injuries.

Stations

Service routes
{|border=1 style="border-collapse: collapse;" class="mw-collapsible"
! colspan="11" style="text-align: center" bgcolor=# | 
|-
| colspan="11" style="text-align: left" | 
 M - Mainline:  ↔ 
 P - Partial Mainline:  ↔ 
|-bgcolor=#
! rowspan="1" colspan="2" |
! colspan="2" | 
! rowspan="2" | 
! colspan="3" rowspan="1" | 
! rowspan="2" | 
! rowspan="2" | 
! rowspan="2" | 
|-bgcolor=#
! rowspan="1" | 
! rowspan="1" | 
! 
! 
! colspan="2" |
! 
|- bgcolor="lightgrey"
|align="center"| ||align="center"|
|
|
|
|
|
|
|rowspan=6|Songjiang
|rowspan=6|West extension under construction
|rowspan=6|
|- bgcolor="lightgrey"
|align="center"| ||align="center"|
|
|
|
|
|
|
|- bgcolor="lightgrey"
|align="center"| ||align="center"|
|
|
|
|
|
|
|- bgcolor="lightgrey"
|align="center"| ||align="center"|
|
|
|
|
|
|
|- bgcolor="lightgrey"
|align="center"| ||align="center"|
|
|
|
|
|
|
|- bgcolor="lightgrey"
|align="center"| ||align="center"|
|
|
|
|
|
|
|-
|align="center"|●||align="center"|
|
|
|
|0.00
|0.00
|0
|rowspan=5|Minhang
|rowspan=16|19 Dec 2015
|rowspan=10|Underground Island
|-
|align="center"|●||align="center"|
|
|
|
|1.73
|1.73
|4
|-
|align="center"|●||align="center"|
|
|
|
|1.23
|2.96
|6
|-
|align="center"|●||align="center"|
|
|
|
|1.87
|4.83
|9
|-
|align="center"|●||align="center"|●
|
|
|
|0.69
|5.52
|11
|-
|align="center"|●||align="center"|●
|
|
|
|1.42
|6.94
|14
|rowspan=8|Xuhui
|-
|align="center"|●||align="center"|●
|
|
|
|0.83
|7.77
|16
|-
|align="center"|●||align="center"|●
|
|
|
|1.55
|9.32
|19
|-
|align="center"|●||align="center"|●
|
|
|
|0.84
|10.16
|21
|-
|align="center"|●||align="center"|●
|
|
|
|1.04
|11.20
|24
|-
|align="center"|●||align="center"|●
|
|
|
|1.35
|12.55
|26
|Underground Side
|-
|align="center"|●||align="center"|●
|
|
|
|1.57
|14.12
|29
|rowspan=6|Underground Island
|-
|align="center"|●||align="center"|●
|
|
|
|1.01
|15.13
|31
|-
|align="center"|●||align="center"|●
|
|
| 
|1.49
|16.62
|34
|rowspan=1|Huangpu
|-
|align="center"|●||align="center"|●
|
|
| 
|1.40
|18.02
|37
|rowspan=4|Jing'an
|-
|align="center"|●||align="center"|●
|
|
| 
|1.48
|19.50
|40
|-
|align="center"|●||align="center"|●
|
|
|
|1.24
|20.74
|43
|10 May 2014
|-
|align="center"|●||align="center"|●
|
|
|
|1.04
|21.78
|45
|rowspan=15|29 Dec 2013
|rowspan=2|Underground Side
|-
|align="center"|●||align="center"|●
|
|
|
|1.69
|23.47
|49
|rowspan=2|Hongkou
|-
|align="center"|●||align="center"|●
|
|
|
|0.98
|24.45
|51
|rowspan=4|Underground Island
|-
|align="center"|●||align="center"|●
|
|
|
|0.79
|25.24
|53
|rowspan=6|Yangpu
|-
|align="center"|●||align="center"|●
|
|
|
|1.29
|26.53
|55
|-
|align="center"|●||align="center"|●
|
|
|
|0.91
|27.44
|58
|-
|align="center"|●||align="center"|●
|
|
|
|1.42
|28.86
|61
|Underground Side
|-
|align="center"|●||align="center"|●
|
|
|
|0.92
|29.78
|63
|rowspan=7|Underground Island
|-
|align="center"|●||align="center"|●
|
|
|
|0.82
|30.60
|65
|-
|align="center"|●||align="center"|●
|
|
|
|1.70
|32.30
|68
|rowspan=6|Pudong
|-
|align="center"|●||align="center"|●
|
|
|
|1.09
|33.39
|71
|-
|align="center"|●||align="center"| 
|
|
|
|1.27
|34.66
|74
|-
|align="center"|●||align="center"| 
|
|
|
|1.16
|35.82
|76
|-
|align="center"|●||align="center"| 
|
|
|
|1.14
|36.96
|78
|-
|align="center"|●||align="center"| 
|
|
|
|2.53
|39.49
|83
|Underground Side
|- style = "background:#; height: 2pt"
| colspan = "11" |
|-
| colspan = "11" |
|- style = "background: #; height: 2pt;"
| colspan = "11" |
|}

Important Stations

 Hanzhong Road – a major interchange station with lines 1 and 13.
  – a major interchange station with lines 1 and 10.
  – located under the busy Nanjing Road, and an interchange station with lines 2 and 13.

Future expansion

West extension
Construction began on December 16, 2022 with six stations planned on the extension, all in Shanghai's Songjiang District.

Station name change
 On June 6, 2012, Chuanchang Road was renamed  (before line 12 began serving the station).

Headways

Technology

Signalling

Rolling Stock
The trains of Line 12 are composed of 6-carriage of Type A cars, with a design speed of 80 km/h, VVVF AC drive, and a design life of 30 years.

References

Shanghai Metro lines
 
Railway lines opened in 2013
2013 establishments in China